Robert Britt Burns (born June 8, 1959) is a former Major League Baseball pitcher from 1978 until 1985, pitching for the Chicago White Sox compiling a career mark of 70 wins and 60 losses with a 3.66 ERA.

Burns pitched for Fultondale High School in 1975, before transferring to Huffman High School in Birmingham, Alabama from 1976 to 1977. He played for legendary prep coach Phil English at Huffman.  he had a variety of pitches, but what made him so effective was the ability to change speeds on various types of pitches. When he graduated, he held the state record for career victories with 35 against only 2 losses (a record that stood for over 12 years), and as of 2008, still holds the single season record for lowest earned run average after posting a 0.00 in 1977.His career high school ERA was 0.12 He was discovered by Chicago Tribune book critic Bob Cromie while pitching in Birmingham in 1978.   He made his debut later that season at the age of 19. Burns did not become as full-time major leaguer until 1980 when he won 15 games.  In 1983 he helped the White Sox into the ALCS against the Baltimore Orioles, pitching 9 innings before surrendering a home run to Tito Landrum in the fourth and final game of the series.

After winning 18 games for Chicago in 1985, Burns was traded on December 12 with Glen Braxton and Mike Soper to the New York Yankees for Ron Hassey and Joe Cowley. A chronic, degenerative hip condition, however, put Burns' career on hold before he could ever pitch for New York. After years of rehab, he attempted a comeback in 1990, making four unsuccessful minor-league starts before finally retiring as a player.

Burns was the minor league pitching coordinator for his hometown Houston Astros until 2010 and was the pitching coach for the Birmingham Barons, the White Sox AA affiliate, through 2015.

References

External links

 Where have you gone, Britt Burns?

American League All-Stars
Chicago White Sox players
Major League Baseball pitchers
1959 births
Living people
Knoxville Sox players
Appleton Foxes players
Iowa Oaks players
Denver Zephyrs players
Columbus Clippers players
Fort Lauderdale Yankees players
Minor league baseball coaches
Baseball coaches from Alabama
Baseball coaches from Texas
Baseball players from Birmingham, Alabama
Baseball players from Houston